New Jerusalem is an unincorporated community in Logan County, in the U.S. state of Ohio.

History
A post office was established at New Jerusalem in 1876, and remained in operation until 1904.

Geography
New Jerusalem is located at the junction of Ohio State Routes 533 and 540, between Bellefontaine and the Zane Shawnee Caverns.

References

Unincorporated communities in Logan County, Ohio
1876 establishments in Ohio
Populated places established in 1876
Unincorporated communities in Ohio